Compass Books may refer to:

 An imprint of Viking Press in the 1950s-1960s
 An imprint of John Hunt Publishing after 2001